Ilie Slăvei (born 4 April 1952) is a Romanian water polo player. He competed at the 1976 Summer Olympics and the 1980 Summer Olympics.

References

External links
 

1952 births
Living people
Romanian male water polo players
Olympic water polo players of Romania
Water polo players at the 1976 Summer Olympics
Water polo players at the 1980 Summer Olympics
Water polo players from Bucharest